Erysimum asperum, the western wallflower (a name it shares with Erysimum capitatum), is a species of flowering plant in the family Brassicaceae. It is native to west-central Canada, the west-central United States, and northern Mexico; in grasslands generally east of the Continental Divide and west of the Mississippi. It is a member of the Erysimum asperum-E. capitatum species complex.

References

asperum
Flora of Alberta
Flora of Saskatchewan
Flora of Manitoba
Flora of Montana
Flora of Wyoming
Flora of Colorado
Flora of North Dakota
Flora of South Dakota
Flora of Nebraska
Flora of Kansas
Flora of Oklahoma
Flora of Minnesota
Flora of Illinois
Flora of the South-Central United States
Flora of Arkansas
Flora of Northwestern Mexico
Flora of Northeastern Mexico
Flora of Southwestern Mexico
Flora of Central Mexico
Flora of Veracruz
Plants described in 1821
Flora without expected TNC conservation status